Public statues in Glasgow, the largest city in Scotland, have been used to display the wealth and history of the city over centuries. The most prominent are those erected by the municipality or by public subscription, but others adorn the façades of the great commercial buildings.

Cathedral Square

Other figures portrayed include St Paul, St Peter and the Four Evangelists on the facade of the Barony North (Glasgow Evangelical) Church to the east of the square – 1878-80 by McCulloch of London.

The nearby Glasgow Necropolis is a "garden" cemetery opened in 1833, in imitation of Père Lachaise Cemetery in Paris, has a number of statues associated with the funerary monuments of the rich and famous buried there. Most of these are private or religious statues, but the hilltop location is dominated by a large monument to John Knox erected in 1825. It consists of a 12 ft high statue of Knox, designed by Robert Forrest, atop a high Doric column by Thomas Hamilton.

Charing Cross

Custom House Quay

Elder Park

George Square
George Square is Glasgow's central public square and was laid out in 1782, with houses appearing between 1784 and 1820. Many of these later became hotels, especially after the opening of Queen Street Station. Only one of the original houses remains - the Millennium Hotel beside the station. The square is now a magnificent public space dominated by the City Chambers, the former Post Office building, ex-Bank of Scotland and the Merchant's House.

Glasgow Harbour

Gordon Street

Ingram Street

Also on Ingram Street is the Italian Centre displaying rather classical looking modern statues by Alexander Stoddart. Inside the centre a distinctively modern man is rather amusingly struck by the same object of interest as his dog.

Kelvingrove Park

Partick Interchange

Royal Exchange Square

Springburn Park

Victoria Park

Woodlands Road

Bibliography
  McKenzie, R., Sculpture in Glasgow:an illustrated handbook  Glasgow The Foulis Archive Press 1999 .
  Williamson, E., Riches, A., and Higgs, M., The Buildings of Scotland: Glasgow Penguin Books London 1990 .

References

External links
Glasgow - City of Sculpture

Public statues
Public art in Glasgow
Glasgow
Outdoor sculptures in Scotland
Statues in Scotland
Glasgow-related lists